Xiao Zhichu (5 March 1897 – 23 February 1958) was a Chinese general in the National Revolutionary Army of the Republic of China (ROC).

Biography
Xiao was born in 1897 in Lüling Town of Mudan District in Heze, Shandong, to Xiao Yuli, a peasant. His grandfather Xiao Jinfeng was a teacher at local old-style private school. In 1915, when he studied at Shandong No. 6 High school (now Heze No. 1 High School), he dropped out of school and enlisted in the army. In May 1923 he graduated from the Baoding Military Academy. In 1927 he participated in the Northern Expedition. The enemy of Chu Yupu were defeated and fled in disorder. From 1931 to 1934 he fought against the Red Army in Hubei, Hunan, Sichuan, and Shaanxi. During the Second Sino-Japanese War, he took part in the Battle of Shanghai, Battle of Wuhan, Battle of Zhejiang and Jiangxi, Battle of Sui-Zao, Battle of East Hubei, Battle of Yi-Sha, Battle of Changsha, Battle of Hengyang, and Battle of Gui-Liu successively. After the defeat of the Nationalists by the Communists in Chinese Civil War in June 1949, Xiao moved to Taiwan with his family. He died of illness at the First Army General Hospital in Taipei in 1958.

Personal life
Xiao was twice married. His first wife was surnamed Wang. They had a son and a daughter. After she died of illness in 1931, Xiao married Chen Mannong. They had five children.

His second son, Shiao Yi, was a Chinese American wuxia ("martial arts and chivalry") novelist. His granddaughter Xiao Qiang, also known as Stephanie Shiao, is an actress in Taiwan.

His former residence is well preserved.

References

Bibliography
 
 
 
 

1897 births
People from Heze
1958 deaths
Chinese anti-communists
Chinese military personnel of World War II
Baoding Military Academy cadets
National Revolutionary Army generals from Shandong
Kuomintang politicians in Taiwan
Chinese Civil War refugees
People of the Northern Expedition